Sari Qamish or Sari Qomish may refer to:
 Sari Qamish, East Azerbaijan
 Sari Qomish, Meyaneh, East Azerbaijan Province
 Sari Qamish, Golestan
 Sari Qamish, Hamadan
 Sari Qomish, West Azerbaijan
 Sari Qomish-e Qeshlaq, West Azerbaijan Province